Leo Nolan (born 1972) is an American boxer.

Leo Nolan may also refer to:

Leo Nolan (footballer) (1910–1993), Australian rules footballer
Leo Nolan (wrestler) (1912–1979), New Zealand wrestler